Michael Richard Hill (born 3 December 1947 in Hereford England – died 23 June 2008) was an English-born, Welsh international footballer who played as a forward.

Career

Club

Hereford-born Hill started his career with Bethesda Athletic and joined Sheffield United in September 1965. His first-team chances were limited, making just 37 appearances for the Yorkshire club in four years. He scored nine goals, his second in a Sheffield Derby game at the end of the 1966–67 season.

Hill moved to Ipswich Town for £33,000 in October 1969, where he scored 20 goals in 77 appearances. He was loaned to Blackpool for a month in June 1972 and played in the Anglo-Italian Cup Final defeat against A.S. Roma at the Stadio Olimpico. The possibility of his joining permanently was killed off when Ipswich rejected the club's undisclosed offer. Blackpool manager Bob Stokoe commented: "I spoke to Ipswich manager Bobby Robson last night, but we cannot come to an agreement at this stage. We went to what we felt we could afford. I appreciate Bobby Robson's gesture in letting us have Mick for a month so that we could assess him."

Hill was transferred for £35,000 to Crystal Palace in December 1973, where he made a further 45 appearances, scoring another six times. In February 1976, Hill moved on to South African football with Cape Town City.

He was a traditional target man for most of his career who earned the nickname 'Mick The Flick' for his propensity to move the ball quickly and with guile when he received it.

His first-team career ended with a total of 33 goals in 159 games.

International
In 1971, Hill played twice for Wales, against Czechoslovakia and Romania in the UEFA European Football Championship qualifying competition.

Death
Hill died on 23 June 2008, aged 60 Mick Mills, his captain at Ipswich, paid this tribute: "Mick was an exceptionally nice lad who everyone liked. He was a decent player with a good touch, but suffered somewhat for taking his off-field approach for life on to the park."

References

External links
 
 Mick Hill profile at Ipswich Town Talk

1947 births
2008 deaths
Welsh footballers
Welsh expatriate footballers
Wales international footballers
Ipswich Town F.C. players
Blackpool F.C. players
Sheffield United F.C. players
Crystal Palace F.C. players
Sportspeople from Hereford
Cape Town City F.C. (NFL) players
Rangers F.C. (South Africa) players
Expatriate soccer players in South Africa
Welsh expatriate sportspeople in South Africa
English Football League players
Association football forwards
Bethesda Athletic F.C. players
National Football League (South Africa) players